The 2014 Copa FGF (also known as the 2014 Copa Fernandão in this edition, in posthumous tribute) was the 11th season of the Copa FGF, the main domestic cup competition in Rio Grande do Sul football, which is a knockout cup competition. The tournament began on 6 August and ended on 8 October with the second leg of final.

In this year, 22 clubs of the state decided to participate in the Copa FGF, which varies in number of participants according to the interest of clubs in the first, second and third divisions of the Campeonato Gaúcho. This time, one of the two greatest clubs in the state, the Grêmio, decided to not participate of the competition.

Novo Hamburgo enters in the 2014 Copa FGF defending his title won in 2013.

Format
The competition is a knockout tournament with pairings for first round (round of 22) drawn at random, being the best placed club in the FGF Club Ranking plays the first leg at away. If that club wins by a difference of two or more goals, it will be automatically qualified for the next round. The same rules serves to Round of 12. From the quarter-finals, the order of matches is decided by lot and the second leg is required.

Twenty-two clubs beginning in the round of 22, being the winners and the best loser advancing to the second round. In the round of 12, the winners and the two best losers qualify for the quarter-finals. Thereafter, only the winners advance to the semifinals and the finals.

The Copa FGF winner qualify for the 2015 Copa do Brasil and for 2014 Super Copa Gaúcha, where it will have the opportunity to qualify for the 2015 Campeonato Brasileiro Série D.

Clubs
This time, Juventude decided to play the competition with the first team squad of his academy, the under-20s team, because of his participation in the Campeonato Brasileiro Série C. Well as the International, which traditionally plays with his academy. The following 22 clubs compete in the Copa FGF during the 2014 edition.

First round

Standings

|}
Note: Guarany (BG) decided to not participate of the cup. Marau is automatically qualified.

Matches

First leg

Second leg

Second round
The draw for the second round take place at the headquarters of FGF on 15 August at 15:00 UTC-03:00. At this stage, the twelve clubs qualified of the first round plays eight places in the quarter-finals of the competition. Two teams from third division of Campeonato Gaúcho have qualified for this stage: Estância Velha and Guarani (VA). On the other side, several first division clubs were eliminated in the first round, including Juventude.

Standings

|}

Matches

First leg

Second leg

Quarter-finals
The draw for the quarter-finals will take place at the headquarters of FGF on 28 August at 15:30 UTC-03:00. A total of 8 teams compete in this round, of which the four winners advances to semi-finals. Only two clubs not dispute the first division of the Campeonato Gaúcho, they being the Santa Cruz-RS, which is currently in the Série A2, and the Guarani (VA), a third division team what makes a brilliant campaign and has advanced against two clubs of the Série A.

Standings

|}

Matches

First leg

Second leg

Records and statistics

Goalscorers
This is the complete list of goalscorers in the 2014 Copa FGF. Players and teams in bold are still active in the competition.

Highest attendances
The 10 highest attendances of the competition are listed here.

References

External links
FGF website. Federação Gaúcha de Futebol.

Copa FGF
Copa FGF, 2014